Kamran ( Kāmrān) is a Persian male given name meaning 'prosperous, fortunate'. The name is commonly used in Iran and Azerbaijan, in addition to Tajikistan, Afghanistan, Uzbekistan, and Pakistan. Variants include Kâmran, Kamron, and Kamuran.

Notable people

Kamran
 Cumrun Vafa, Iranian physicist
 Kamran Agayev, Azerbaijani footballer
 Kamran Akmal, Pakistani batsman wicketkeeper
 Kamran Atif, member of Harkat-ul Mujahideen al-Alami
 Kamran Bagheri Lankarani, Iran's Minister of Health and Medical Education
 Kamran Baghirov, Azerbaijani politician 
 Kamran Daneshjoo, Iranian politician, minister
 Kamran Diba (born 1937), Iranian architect
 Kamran Elahian (born 1954), Iranian-American entrepreneur 
 Kamran Ghadakchian (born 1947), Iranian director
 Kamran Hedayati (1949–1996), Kurdish-Iranian dissident
 Kamran Ince (born 1960), Turkish-American composer 
 Kamran Khan (disambiguation), several people
 Kamran Mirza (1509–1557), the second son of Babur, the founder of the Mughal dynasty
 Kamran Mirza Nayeb es-Saltaneh (1856–1929), Persian prince of the Qajar Dynasty
 Kamran Pasha, Hollywood screenwriter and director
 Kamran Shakhsuvarly (born 1992), Azerbaijani boxer 
 Kamran Shirazi (born 1952), Iranian chess player

Kâmran
 Kâmran İnan (1929–2015), Turkish politician of Kurdish origin

Kamuran
 Kamuran Alî Bedirxan (1895–1978), Kurdish politician, lawyer and writer
 Kamuran Gürün (1924–2004), Turkish diplomat
 Kamuran Toktanış (born 1974), Turkish footballer

Fictional characters
 Kamran (Marvel Cinematic Universe), character from Ms. Marvel

Persian masculine given names
Azerbaijani masculine given names
Turkish masculine given names
Pakistani masculine given names